Year 988 (CMLXXXVIII) was a leap year starting on Sunday (link will display the full calendar) of the Julian calendar.

Events 
 By place 

 Byzantine Empire 
 Fall – Emperor Basil II, supported by a contingent of 6,000 Varangians (the future Varangian Guard), organizes the defences of Constantinople to meet a threat from the insurgents, Bardas Phokas the Younger and Bardas Skleros. Basil crosses the Bosphorus, and leads a surprise attack on the rebel camp of Kalokyros Delphinas, at Chrysopolis. Delphinas is captured and executed, either by crucifixion or by impalement (approximate date).

 Europe 
 April 1 – 16-year old Robert II of France ("Robert the Pious") is married to the much older Rozala (the widow of Arnulf II). The marriage is arranged by Robert's father, King Hugh Capet, to secure the loyalty of the County of Flanders. 
 Borrell II, count of Barcelona, does not renew his allegiance to Hugh Capet. He becomes a de facto independent ruler, and starts minting its own currency – this will be confirmed legally by the Treaty of Corbeil (1258).
 Charles, Duke of Lower Lorraine (younger brother of the late King Lothair of France), revolts against Hugh Capet. He conquers the city of Laon in northern France with support of his half-brother Arnulf (archbishop of Reims).
 Almanzor (Al-Mansur), de facto ruler of Al-Andalus, continues his offensive against the kingdoms of León and Castile. King Bermudo II escapes to Zamora; the city resists for four days, but is finally sacked and captured.

 China 
 The Liao dynasty adopts civil service examinations in the 'Southern Chancellery', based on Tang dynasty models (approximate date).

 By topic 

 Religion 
 Grand Prince Vladimir the Great, ruler of Kievan Rus', marries Anna Porphyrogenita (sister of Basil II) and converts to Christianity. He is baptized at Cherson in the Crimea, taking the Christian name of Basil (in honor of his brother-in-law). Vladimir returns in triumph to Kiev, and begins the Christianization of Kievan Rus' to the Eastern Orthodox Church.
 The Mezhyhirskyi Monastery (located on the Dnieper River) is founded by Michael I, first metropolitan bishop of Kiev. He arrives with Greek monks from Constantinople.

 Economy 
 March 18 – The city of Odense (located on the island of Funen) in Denmark is founded. King Otto III grants trade rights and to the neighbouring settlements.

Births 
 Ali ibn Ridwan, Arab physician and astrologer (d. 1061)
 Matilda of Swabia, German noblewoman (d. 1032)
 Minamoto no Yoriyoshi, Japanese nobleman (d. 1075)
 Nōin, Japanese monk and waka poet (d. 1051)
 Pang Ji, chancellor of the Song Dynasty (d. 1063)
 Shōshi, empress consort of Japan (d. 1074)
 Stephen I, king of Croatia (approximate date)
 Tilopa, Indian tantric practitioner (d. 1069)

Deaths 
 February 13 – Adalbert Atto, Lombard nobleman
 April 28 – Adaldag, archbishop of Bremen
 May 6 – Dirk II, count of Frisia and Holland
 May 19 – Dunstan, archbishop of Canterbury (b. 909)
 October 7 – Qian Chu, king of Wuyue (d. 929)
 Bagrat II, prince of Tao-Klarjeti (Georgia)
 Guerech, Frankish nobleman (approximate date)
 Ieuaf (Idwal ab Idwal), king of Gwynedd (Wales)
 Judith of Hungary, queen of Poland (approximate date)
 Kalokyros Delphinas, Byzantine general (or 989)
 Sumbat II, prince of Tao-Klarjeti (Georgia)
 Vigrahapala II, ruler of the Pala Empire (India)
 Yelü Sha, Chinese general and statesman

References